The Páva Street Synagogue is a large-scale Hungarian synagogue building designed by Lipót Baumhorn in the first half of the 20th century, and nowadays it houses the Holocaust Memorial Center and the Budapest Synagogue.

History 
In the 1910s, the Jews of Józsefváros in Budapest set out to build a new, large-sized synagogue. A plot on the corner of Páva Street and Tűzoltó Street (Budapest, Páva u. 39, 1094), offered by the Belatini Braun Géza factory, was designed by Miklós Román, designer of the Aszód synagogue, but due to World War I between 1914 and 1918 not realized. In 1923 the issue was again on the agenda and Lipót Baumhorn, the great old man of Hungarian synagogue building, made a new plan. Based on this, the synagogue was built by January 1924.

Built to accommodate 1,700 people, it was handled by the Pest Jewish Community. On April 17, 1926, the Equality Magazine presented the interior of the new synagogue to a wider audience: “In addition to the rich and yet decent gold plating, the three traditional Jewish colors are rich in architectonic painting: blue, white, yellow. The style of painting is considered novel: curtain drapes, often used in medieval painting, have a beautiful effect on the apse of the sanctuary with the motifs on the walls; on the parapet of the female gallery, the outlined fields are scattered with maccabe lilies, and the blue pillar flanking the shrine apse represents two columns of the Solomon's Temple, traditionally Hebrew. In the great temple arc, the enormous slogan of Jewish ethics shines: "Love your neighbor as yourself" in Hebrew and Hungarian. All the motifs of the painting were designed and drawn by the architect Lipót Baumhorn in the smallest detail.”

In the 1980s, the building housed the office and culture room of the local Israeli religious district, while the winter prayer hall served religious functions. The modern building of the Holocaust Documentation Center and Memorial has been set up in its immediate surroundings.

Gallery

Sources 
 (szerk.) Gerő László: Magyarországi zsinagógák, Műszaki Könyvkiadó, Budapest, 1989, 214–215. o.

External links
Ferencváros (Páva St.) Synagogue in the Bezalel Narkiss Index of Jewish Art, Center for Jewish Art, Hebrew University of Jerusalem

Video 
 Video about the synagogue

Synagogues in Budapest
Synagogues completed in 1924
1924 in Hungary
Lipót Baumhorn buildings